Haliday Bay is a locality in the Mackay Region, Queensland, Australia.

Geography
The waters of the Coral Sea form the northern and north-western boundaries.

References 

Mackay Region
Localities in Queensland